Peru (Quechua: Piruw), officially the Republic of Peru, is a country in western South America. It is bordered in the north by Ecuador and Colombia, in the east by Brazil, in the southeast by Bolivia, in the south by Chile, and in the south and west by the Pacific Ocean. Peru is a megadiverse country with habitats ranging from the arid plains of the Pacific coastal region in the west to the peaks of the Andes mountains extending from the north to the southeast of the country to the tropical Amazon basin rainforest in the east with the Amazon River. Peru has a population of over 32 million, and its capital and largest city is Lima. At 1,285,216 km2 (496,225 sq mi), Peru is the 19th largest country in the world, and the third largest in South America.

Peruvian territory was home to several cultures during the ancient and medieval periods, and has one of the longest histories of civilization of any country, tracing its heritage back to the 10th millennium BCE.  Notable pre-colonial cultures and civilizations include the Caral-Supe civilization (the earliest civilization in the Americas and considered one of the cradles of civilization,) the Nazca culture, the Wari and Tiwanaku empires, the Kingdom of Cusco, and the Inca Empire, the largest known state in the pre-Columbian Americas.

The Spanish Empire conquered the region in the 16th century and Charles V established a viceroyalty in 1542 with the official name of the Kingdom of Peru that encompassed most of its South American territories, with its capital in Lima. Higher education started in the Americas with the official establishment of the National University of San Marcos in Lima in 1551. Peru formally proclaimed independence in 1821, and following the foreign military campaigns of José de San Martín and Simón Bolívar, and the decisive battle of Ayacucho, Peru completed its independence in 1824 and its first congress decided to adopt Bolivar's republican system over San Martín's monarchist proposal that was supported by a large part of the population and aristocracy. In the ensuing years, the country first suffered from political instability until a period of relative economic and political stability began due to the exploitation of guano that ended with the War of the Pacific. In the 20th century, the country endured coups, social unrest, and internal conflicts, as well as periods of stability and economic upswing. In the 1990s, the country implemented a neoliberal economic model which is still in use to this day.  As the 2000s commodities boom took place, Peru experienced a period of constant economic growth, while government finances, poverty reduction and progress in social sectors improved. The nation has more recently adopted the Lima Consensus, an economic ideology of neoliberalism, deregulation and free market policies that has made foreign portfolio investment in Peru attractive. Inflation in 2012 was the lowest in Latin America at 1.8%, with the most recent annual rate standing at 1.9% in 2020. Though statistical poverty has decreased significantly – from nearly 60% in 2004 to 20.5% in 2018.

The sovereign state of Peru is a representative democratic republic divided into 25 regions. Peru has a high level of human development with an upper middle income level ranking 82nd on the Human Development Index. It is one of the region's most prosperous economies with an average growth rate of 5.9% (in 2017) and it has one of the world's fastest industrial growth rates at an average of 9.6% (as of 2018). Its main economic activities include mining, manufacturing, agriculture and fishing, along with other growing sectors such as telecommunications and biotechnology. The country forms part of The Pacific Pumas, a political and economic grouping of countries along Latin America's Pacific coast that share common trends of positive growth, stable macroeconomic foundations, improved governance and an openness to global integration. Peru ranks high in social freedom; it is an active member of the Asia-Pacific Economic Cooperation, the Pacific Alliance, the Comprehensive and Progressive Agreement for Trans-Pacific Partnership and the World Trade Organization; and is considered as a middle power.

Peru has a population that includes Mestizos, Amerindians, Europeans, Africans and Asians. The main spoken language is Spanish, although a significant number of Peruvians speak Quechuan languages, Aymara, or other Indigenous languages. This mixture of cultural traditions has resulted in a wide diversity of expressions in diverse fields, making the country a world-renowned gastronomical destiny, along with other topics such as art, literature, and music.

Etymology 
The name of the country may be derived from Birú, the name of a local ruler who lived near the Bay of San Miguel, Panama City, in the early 16th century. Spanish conquistadors, who arrived in 1522, believed this was the southernmost part of the New World. When Francisco Pizarro invaded the regions farther south, they came to be designated Birú or Perú.

An alternative history is provided by the contemporary writer Inca Garcilaso de la Vega, son of an Inca princess and a conquistador. He said the name Birú was that of a common Amerindian who was happened upon by the crew of a ship on an exploratory mission for governor Pedro Arias Dávila and went on to relate more instances of misunderstandings due to the lack of a common language.

The Spanish Crown gave the name legal status with the 1529 Capitulación de Toledo, which designated the newly encountered Inca Empire as the province of Peru. In 1561, the rebel Lope de Aguirre declared himself the "Prince" of an independent Peru, which was cut short by his arrest and execution. Under Spanish rule, the country adopted the denomination Viceroyalty of Peru, which became the Peruvian Republic after its independence until 1979, adopting its current name of Republic of Peru.

History

Prehistory and Pre-Columbian Peru

The earliest evidences of human presence in Peruvian territory have been dated to approximately 12,500 BCE in the Huaca Prieta settlement.  Andean societies were based on agriculture, using techniques such as irrigation and terracing; camelid husbandry and fishing were also important. Organization relied on reciprocity and redistribution because these societies had no notion of market or money. The oldest known complex society in Peru, the Caral/Norte Chico civilization, flourished along the coast of the Pacific Ocean between 3,000 and 1,800 BCE. These early developments were followed by archaeological cultures that developed mostly around the coastal and Andean regions throughout Peru. The Cupisnique culture which flourished from around 1000 to 200 BCE along what is now Peru's Pacific coast was an example of early pre-Inca culture.

The Chavín culture that developed from 1500 to 300 BCE was probably more of a religious than a political phenomenon, with their religious center in Chavín de Huantar. After the decline of the Chavin culture around the beginning of the 1st century CE, a series of localized and specialized cultures rose and fell, both on the coast and in the highlands, during the next thousand years. On the coast, these included the civilizations of the Paracas, Nazca, Wari, and the more outstanding Chimu and Moche.

The Moche, who reached their apogee in the first millennium CE, were renowned for their irrigation system which fertilized their arid terrain, their sophisticated ceramic pottery, their lofty buildings, and clever metalwork. The Chimu were the great city builders of pre-Inca civilization; as a loose confederation of walled cities scattered along the coast of northern Peru, the Chimu flourished from about 1140 to 1450. Their capital was at Chan Chan outside of modern-day Trujillo. In the highlands, both the Tiahuanaco culture, near Lake Titicaca in both Peru and Bolivia, and the Wari culture, near the present-day city of Ayacucho, developed large urban settlements and wide-ranging state systems between 500 and 1000 CE.In the 15th century, the Incas emerged as a powerful state which, in the span of a century, formed the largest empire in the pre-Columbian Americas with their capital in Cusco. The Incas of Cusco originally represented one of the small and relatively minor ethnic groups, the Quechuas. Gradually, as early as the thirteenth century, they began to expand and incorporate their neighbors. Inca expansion was slow until about the middle of the fifteenth century, when the pace of conquest began to accelerate, particularly under the rule of the emperor Pachacuti. Under his rule and that of his son, Topa Inca Yupanqui, the Incas came to control most of the Andean region, with a population of 9 to 16 million inhabitants under their rule. Pachacuti also promulgated a comprehensive code of laws to govern his far-flung empire, while consolidating his absolute temporal and spiritual authority as the God of the Sun who ruled from a magnificently rebuilt Cusco. From 1438 to 1533, the Incas used a variety of methods, from conquest to peaceful assimilation, to incorporate a large portion of western South America, centered on the Andean mountain ranges, from southern Colombia to northern Chile, between the Pacific Ocean in the west and the Amazon rainforest in the east. The official language of the empire was Quechua, although hundreds of local languages and dialects were spoken. The Inca referred to their empire as Tawantinsuyu which can be translated as "The Four Regions" or "The Four United Provinces." Many local forms of worship persisted in the empire, most of them concerning local sacred Huacas, but the Inca leadership encouraged the worship of Inti, the sun god and imposed its sovereignty above other cults such as that of Pachamama. The Incas considered their King, the Sapa Inca, to be the "child of the sun."

Conquest and colonial period

Atahualpa (also Atahuallpa), the last Sapa Inca, became emperor when he defeated and executed his older half-brother Huáscar in a civil war sparked by the death of their father, Inca Huayna Capac. In December 1532, a party of conquistadors (supported by the Chankas, Huancas, Cañaris and Chachapoyas as Indian auxiliaries) led by Francisco Pizarro defeated and captured the Inca Emperor Atahualpa in the Battle of Cajamarca. The Spanish conquest of Peru was one of the most important campaigns in the Spanish colonization of the Americas. After years of preliminary exploration and military conflicts, it was the first step in a long campaign that took decades of fighting but ended in Spanish victory and colonization of the region known as the Viceroyalty of Peru with its capital at Lima, which was then known as "La Ciudad de los Reyes" (The City of Kings). The conquest of Peru led to spin-off campaigns throughout the viceroyalty as well as expeditions towards the Amazon Basin as in the case of Spanish efforts to quell Amerindian resistance. The last Inca resistance was suppressed when the Spaniards annihilated the Neo-Inca State in Vilcabamba in 1572.

The Indigenous population dramatically collapsed overwhelmingly due to epidemic diseases introduced by the Spanish as well as exploitation and socio-economic change. Viceroy Francisco de Toledo reorganized the country in the 1570s with gold and silver mining as its main economic activity and Amerindian forced labor as its primary workforce. With the discovery of the great silver and gold lodes at Potosí (present-day Bolivia) and Huancavelica, the viceroyalty flourished as an important provider of mineral resources. Peruvian bullion provided revenue for the Spanish Crown and fueled a complex trade network that extended as far as Europe and the Philippines. The commercial and population exchanges between Latin America and Asia undergone via the Manila Galleons transiting through Acapulco, had Callao at Peru as the furthest endpoint of the trade route in the Americas. In relation to this, Don Sebastian Hurtado de Corcuera, governor of Panama was also responsible for settling Zamboanga City in the Philippines, which now speak a Spanish Creole by employing Peruvian soldiers and colonists. Because of lack of available workforce, African slaves were added to the labor population. The expansion of a colonial administrative apparatus and bureaucracy paralleled the economic reorganization. With the conquest started the spread of Christianity in South America; most people were forcefully converted to Catholicism, with Spanish clerics believing like Puritan divines of English colonies later that the Native Peoples "had been corrupted by the Devil, who was working "through them to frustrate" their foundations. It only took a generation to convert the population. They built churches in every city and replaced some of the Inca temples with churches, such as the Coricancha in the city of Cusco. The church employed the Inquisition, making use of torture to ensure that newly converted Catholics did not stray to other religions or beliefs, and monastery schools, educating girls, especially of the Inca nobility and upper class, "until they were old enough either to profess [to become a nun] or to leave the monastery and assume the role ('estado') in the Christian society that their fathers planned to erect" in Peru. Peruvian Catholicism follows the syncretism found in many Latin American countries, in which religious native rituals have been integrated with Christian celebrations. In this endeavor, the church came to play an important role in the acculturation of the Natives, drawing them into the cultural orbit of the Spanish settlers.
By the 18th century, declining silver production and economic diversification greatly diminished royal income. In response, the Crown enacted the Bourbon Reforms, a series of edicts that increased taxes and partitioned the Viceroyalty. The new laws provoked Túpac Amaru II's rebellion and other revolts, all of which were suppressed. As a result of these and other changes, the Spaniards and their creole successors came to monopolize control over the land, seizing many of the best lands abandoned by the massive native depopulation. However, the Spanish did not resist the Portuguese expansion of Brazil across the meridian. The Treaty of Tordesillas was rendered meaningless between 1580 and 1640 while Spain controlled Portugal. The need to ease communication and trade with Spain led to the split of the viceroyalty and the creation of new viceroyalties of New Granada and Rio de la Plata at the expense of the territories that formed the Viceroyalty of Peru; this reduced the power, prominence and importance of Lima as the viceroyal capital and shifted the lucrative Andean trade to Buenos Aires and Bogotá, while the fall of the mining and textile production accelerated the progressive decay of the Viceroyalty of Peru.

Eventually, the viceroyalty would dissolve, as with much of the Spanish empire, when challenged by national independence movements at the beginning of the nineteenth century. These movements led to the formation of the majority of modern-day countries of South America in the territories that at one point or another had constituted the Viceroyalty of Peru. The conquest and colony brought a mix of cultures and ethnicities that did not exist before the Spanish conquered the Peruvian territory. Even though many of the Inca traditions were lost or diluted, new customs, traditions and knowledge were added, creating a rich mixed Peruvian culture. Two of the most important Indigenous rebellions against the Spanish were that of Juan Santos Atahualpa in 1742, and Rebellion of Túpac Amaru II in 1780 around the highlands near Cuzco.

Independence

In the early 19th century, while most South American nations were swept by wars of independence, Peru remained a royalist stronghold. As the elite vacillated between emancipation and loyalty to the Spanish Monarchy, independence was achieved only after the occupation by military campaigns of José de San Martín and Simón Bolívar.

The economic crises, the loss of power of Spain in Europe, the war of independence in North America, and Native uprisings all contributed to a favorable climate to the development of emancipation ideas among the Criollo population in South America. However, the Criollo oligarchy in Peru enjoyed privileges and remained loyal to the Spanish Crown. The liberation movement started in Argentina where autonomous juntas were created as a result of the loss of authority of the Spanish government over its colonies.

After fighting for the independence of the Viceroyalty of Rio de la Plata, José de San Martín created the Army of the Andes and crossed the Andes in 21 days. Once in Chile, he joined forces with Chilean army General Bernardo O'Higgins and liberated the country in the battles of Chacabuco and Maipú in 1818. On 7 September 1820, a fleet of eight warships arrived in the port of Paracas under the command of General José de San Martin and Thomas Cochrane, who was serving in the Chilean Navy. Immediately on 26 October, they took control of the town of Pisco. San Martin settled in Huacho on 12 November, where he established his headquarters while Cochrane sailed north and blockaded the port of Callao in Lima. At the same time in the north, Guayaquil was occupied by rebel forces under the command of Gregorio Escobedo. Because Peru was the stronghold of the Spanish government in South America, San Martin's strategy to liberate Peru was to use diplomacy. He sent representatives to Lima urging the Viceroy that Peru be granted independence, however, all negotiations proved unsuccessful.

The Viceroy of Peru, Joaquín de la Pazuela named José de la Serna commander-in-chief of the loyalist army to protect Lima from the threatened invasion by San Martin. On 29 January, de la Serna organized a coup against de la Pazuela, which was recognized by Spain and he was named Viceroy of Peru. This internal power struggle contributed to the success of the liberating army. To avoid a military confrontation, San Martin met the newly appointed viceroy, José de la Serna, and proposed to create a constitutional monarchy, a proposal that was turned down. De la Serna abandoned the city, and on 12 July 1821, San Martin occupied Lima and declared Peruvian independence on 28 July 1821. He created the first Peruvian flag. Upper Peru (Bolivia) remained as a Spanish stronghold until the army of Simón Bolívar liberated it three years later. José de San Martin was declared Protector of Peru. Peruvian national identity was forged during this period, as Bolivarian projects for a Latin American Confederation floundered and a union with Bolivia proved ephemeral.

Simon Bolivar launched his campaign from the north, liberating the Viceroyalty of New Granada in the Battles of Carabobo in 1821 and Pichincha a year later. In July 1822, Bolivar and San Martin gathered in the Guayaquil Conference. Bolivar was left in charge of fully liberating Peru while San Martin retired from politics after the first parliament was assembled. The newly founded Peruvian Congress named Bolivar dictator of Peru, giving him the power to organize the military.

With the help of Antonio José de Sucre, they defeated the larger Spanish army in the Battle of Junín on 6 August 1824 and the decisive Battle of Ayacucho on 9 December of the same year, consolidating the independence of Peru and Alto Peru. Alto Peru was later established as Bolivia. During the early years of the Republic, endemic struggles for power between military leaders caused political instability.

19th century

From the 1840s to the 1860s, Peru enjoyed a period of stability under the presidency of Ramón Castilla, through increased state revenues from guano exports. However, by the 1870s, these resources had been depleted, the country was heavily indebted, and political in-fighting was again on the rise. Peru embarked on a railroad-building program that helped but also bankrupted the country.

In 1879, Peru entered the War of the Pacific which lasted until 1884. Bolivia invoked its alliance with Peru against Chile. The Peruvian Government tried to mediate the dispute by sending a diplomatic team to negotiate with the Chilean government, but the committee concluded that war was inevitable. Chile declared war on 5 April 1879. Almost five years of war ended with the loss of the department of Tarapacá and the provinces of Tacna and Arica, in the Atacama region. Two outstanding military leaders throughout the war were Francisco Bolognesi and Miguel Grau. Originally Chile committed to a referendum for the cities of Arica and Tacna to be held years later, to self determine their national affiliation. However, Chile refused to apply the Treaty, and neither of the countries could determine the statutory framework. After the War of the Pacific, an extraordinary effort of rebuilding began. The government started to initiate a number of social and economic reforms to recover from the damage of the war. Political stability was achieved only in the early 1900s.

20th century 

Internal struggles after the war were followed by a period of stability under the Civilista Party, which lasted until the onset of the authoritarian regime of Augusto B. Leguía. The Great Depression caused the downfall of Leguía, renewed political turmoil, and the emergence of the American Popular Revolutionary Alliance (APRA). The rivalry between this organization and a coalition of the elite and the military defined Peruvian politics for the following three decades. A final peace treaty in 1929, signed between Peru and Chile called the Treaty of Lima, returned Tacna to Peru. Between 1932 and 1933, Peru was engulfed in a year-long war with Colombia over a territorial dispute involving the Amazonas Department and its capital Leticia.

Later, in 1941, Peru and Ecuador fought the Ecuadorian–Peruvian War, after which the Rio Protocol sought to formalize the boundary between those two countries. In a military coup on 29 October 1948, General Manuel A. Odría became president. Odría's presidency was known as the Ochenio. He came down hard on APRA, momentarily pleasing the oligarchy and all others on the right, but followed a populist course that won him great favor with the poor and lower classes. A thriving economy allowed him to indulge in expensive but crowd-pleasing social policies. At the same time, however, civil rights were severely restricted and corruption was rampant throughout his regime. Odría was succeeded by Manuel Prado Ugarteche. However, widespread allegations of fraud prompted the Peruvian military to depose Prado and install a military junta, via a coup d'état led by Ricardo Pérez Godoy. Godoy ran a short transitional government and held new elections in 1963, which were won by Fernando Belaúnde Terry who assumed presidency until 1968. Belaúnde was recognized for his commitment to the democratic process.

On October 3, 1968, another coup d'état led by a group of officers led by General Juan Velasco Alvarado brought the army to power with the aim of applying a doctrine of "social progress and integral development", nationalist and reformist, influenced by the CEPAL theses on dependence and underdevelopment. Six days after the golpe, Velasco proceeded to nationalize the International Petroleum Corporation (IPC), the North American company that exploited Peruvian oil, and then launched a reform of the state apparatus, an agrarian reform. It was the biggest agrarian reform ever undertaken in Latin America: it abolished the latifunda system and modernized agriculture through a more equitable redistribution of land (90% of the peasants formed cooperatives or agricultural societies of social interest). Land was to be owned by those who cultivated it, and large landowners were expropriated. The only large properties allowed were cooperatives. Between 1969 and 1976, 325,000 families received land from the state with an average size of 73.6 acres. The "revolutionary government" also planned massive investments in education, elevated the Quechua language – spoken by nearly half the population but hitherto despised by the authorities – to a status equivalent to that of Spanish and established equal rights for natural children. Peru wished to free itself from any dependence and carried out a third-world foreign policy. The United States responded with commercial, economic and diplomatic pressure. In 1973, Peru seemed to triumph over the financial blockade imposed by Washington by negotiating a loan from the International Development Bank to finance its agricultural and mining development policy. The relations with Chile became very tense after the coup d'état of the general Pinochet. General Edgardo Mercado Jarrin (Prime Minister and Commander-in-Chief of the Army) and Admiral Guillermo Faura Gaig (Minister of the Navy) both escaped assassination attempts within weeks of each other. In 1975, General Francisco Morales Bermúdez Cerruti seized power and broke with the policies of his predecessor. His regime occasionally participated in Operation Condor in collaboration with other American military dictatorships.

Peru engaged in a two week long conflict with Ecuador during the Paquisha War in early 1981 as a result of territorial dispute between the two countries. The economic policy President Alan García distanced Peru from international markets further, resulting in lower foreign investment in the country. After the country experienced chronic inflation, the Peruvian currency, the sol, was replaced by the Inti in mid-1985, which itself was later replaced by the nuevo sol in July 1991, at which time the new sol had a cumulative value of one billion old soles. The per capita annual income of Peruvians fell to $720 (below the level of 1960) and Peru's GDP dropped 20% at which national reserves were a negative $900 million. The economic turbulence of the time acerbated social tensions in Peru and partly contributed to the rise of violent rebel rural insurgent movements, like Sendero Luminoso (Shining Path) and MRTA, which caused great havoc throughout the country. The Shining Path had appeared in the universities in the 1970s. These students, many of them from peasant backgrounds, then returned to their communities and organized local party committees. The abandonment by the state of certain rural regions favored the establishment of the party. In June 1979, demonstrations for free education were severely repressed by the army: 18 people were killed according to the official report, but non-governmental estimates put the death toll at several dozen. This event led to a radicalization of political protests in the countryside and eventually to the outbreak of armed struggle. After the beginning of the armed struggle, the new recruits of the Shining Path were generally peasants with little political background, rather than truly political militants.

The Peruvian armed forces grew frustrated with the inability of the García administration to handle the nation's crises and drafted Plan Verde – which involved the genocide of impoverished and indigenous Peruvians, the control or censorship of the media in Peru and the establishment of a neoliberal economy controlled by a military junta in Peru –  as an effort to overthrow his government. Alberto Fujimori assumed the presidency in 1990 and according to Rospigliosi, the head of the National Intelligence Service (SIN) General Edwin “Cucharita” Díaz and Vladimiro Montesinos played a key role with making President Fujimori abide by the military's demands while "an understanding was established between Fujimori, Montesinos and some of the military officers" involved in Plan Verde prior to Fujimori's inauguration. Fujimori would go on to adopt many of the policies outlined in Plan Verde. Fujimori's policies, prescribed by Hernando de Soto, led to the immediate suffering of poor Peruvians who saw unregulated prices increase rapidly, with those living in poverty seeing prices increase so much that they could no longer afford food. De Soto advocated for the collapse of Peru's society, with the economist saying that a civil crisis was necessary to support the policies of Fujimori. These drastic measures caused inflation to drop from 7,650% in 1990 to 139% in 1991 and 57% in 1992.

Due to his controversial governance, Fujimori faced opposition to his reform efforts and utilized coup proposals from Plan Verde, dissolving Congress, suspending the judiciary, arresting several opposition leaders and assuming full powers in the auto-golpe ("self-coup") of 5 April 1992. He then revised the constitution; called new congressional elections; and implemented substantial economic reform, including privatization of numerous state-owned companies, creation of an investment-friendly climate, and sound management of the economy. Fujimori's administration was dogged by insurgent groups, most notably the Sendero Luminoso (also called the Shining Path), who carried out terrorist campaigns across the country throughout the 1980s and 1990s. Fujimori cracked down on the insurgents and was successful in largely quelling them by the late 1990s, but the fight was marred by atrocities committed by both the Peruvian security forces and the insurgents: the Barrios Altos massacre and La Cantuta massacre by Government paramilitary groups, and the bombings of Tarata and Frecuencia Latina by Sendero Luminoso. Those incidents subsequently came to symbolize the human rights violations committed in the last years of violence. His Programa Nacional de Población – an implementation of one of Plan Verde's proposals for the "total extermination" of impoverished Peruvians that would possibly be sympathetic to insurgent groups – also resulted with the forced sterilization of at least 300,000 poor and indigenous women.

In early 1995, once again Peru and Ecuador clashed in the Cenepa War, but in 1998 the governments of both nations signed a peace treaty that clearly demarcated the international boundary between them. In November 2000, Fujimori resigned from office and went into a self-imposed exile, initially avoiding prosecution for human rights violations and corruption charges by the new Peruvian authorities.

21st century

Since the end of the Fujimori regime, Peru has tried to fight corruption while sustaining economic growth. In spite of human rights progress since the time of insurgency, many problems are still visible and show the continued marginalization of those who suffered through the violence of the Peruvian conflict. A caretaker government presided over by Valentín Paniagua took on the responsibility of conducting new presidential and congressional elections. Afterwards Alejandro Toledo became president in 2001 to 2006.

On 28 July 2006, former president Alan García became President of Peru after winning the 2006 elections. In May 2008, Peru became a member of the Union of South American Nations. In April 2009, former president Alberto Fujimori was convicted of human rights violations and sentenced to 25 years in prison for his role in killings and kidnappings by the Grupo Colina death squad during his government's battle against leftist guerrillas in the 1990s. On 5 June 2011, Ollanta Humala was elected president. During his presidency, Prime Minister Ana Jara and her cabinet were successfully censured, which was the first time in 50 years that a cabinet had been forced to resign from the Peruvian legislature. In 2016, Pedro Pablo Kuczynski was elected, though his government was short-lived as he resigned in 2018 amid various controversies surrounding his administration. Vice president Martín Vizcarra then assumed office in March 2018 with generally favorable approval ratings. Alan García was involved in the Operation Car Wash scandal and as police tried to arrest him, he committed suicide on 17 April 2019. Later that year, in July, police arrested Alejandro Toledo in California. Amid the crisis, on 30 September 2019, President Vizcarra dissolved the congress, and elections were held on 26 January 2020. The first case of COVID-19 was confirmed on 6 March 2020. During the COVID-19 pandemic in Peru, most Peruvians were under a stay-at-home order by President Martin Vizcarra. However, an economic crisis triggered by the pandemic led to his removal from the presidency, seen by many as a coup by congress, and the far-right government of Manuel Merino, the new president, received a lot of backlash. Protests sprang across the country, and after five days, Merino resigned. He was replaced by Francisco Sagasti. Sagasti led a provisional, centrist government, and enforced many of Vizcarra's former policies. Elections were held on 11 April 2021, and Pedro Castillo of the Free Peru party won the first round, followed closely by Keiko Fujimori.

On 28 July 2021, Pedro Castillo was sworn in as the new president of Peru after a narrow win in a tightly contested run-off election. The new Peruvian president Castillo appointed Guido Bellido, a member of Free Peru Party, as prime minister. That same year, Peru celebrated the bicentenary of independence on its 200th anniversary.
In March and April 2022, protests and demonstrations against the government of  President Castillo were widely spread in the country. The demonstrators demanded the removal of President Pedro Castillo, because of difficult economic conditions and the allegations of corruption. Castillo faced multiple impeachment votes during his presidency from the opposition controlled Congress.  On December 7, just hours before Congress was set to begin a third impeachment effort, Castillo tried to prevent this by attempting to dissolve the opposition-controlled legislature and create an "exceptional emergency government." In response, Congress quickly held an emergency session on the same day, during which it voted 101-6 (with 10 abstentions) to remove Castillo from office and replace him with Vice President Dina Boluarte. She became the country’s first female president. Castillo was arrested after trying to flee to the Mexican embassy and was charged with the crime of rebellion.

Government and politics

Peru is a unitary semi-presidential republic with a multi-party system. The country has maintained a liberal democratic system under its 1993 Constitution, which replaced a constitution that leaned the government to a federation to authorize more power to the president. It is also a unitary republic, in which the central government holds the most power and can create administrative divisions. The Peruvian system of government combines elements derived from the political systems of the United States (a written constitution, an autonomous Supreme court, and a presidential system) and the People's Republic of China (a unicameral congress, a premier and ministry system).

The Peruvian government is separated into three branches:

 Legislature: the unicameral Congress of Peru, consisting of 130 members of Congress (on a basis of population), the president of Congress, and the Permanent Commission;
 Executive: the president, the Council of Ministers, which in practice controls domestic legislation and serve as a Cabinet to the president, consisting of the prime minister and 18 ministers of the state;
 Judiciary: the Supreme Court of Peru, also known as the Royal Audencia of Lima, composed of 18 justices including a supreme justice, along with 28 superior courts, 195 trial courts, and 1,838 district courts.

Under its constitution, the president of Peru is both head of state and government and is elected to a five-year term without immediate reelection. The president appoints ministers who oversee the 18 ministries of the state, including the prime minister, into the Cabinet. The constitution designates minimal authority to the prime minister, who presides over cabinet meetings in which ministers advise the president and acts as a spokesperson on behalf of the executive branch. The president is also able to pose questions of confidence to the Congress of Peru, and consequently order the dissolution of congress, done in 1992 by Alberto Fujimori and in 2019 by Martín Vizcarra.

In the Congress of Peru, there are 130 Members of Congress from 25 administrative divisions, determined by respective population, elected to five-year terms. Bills are proposed by the executive and legislative powers and become law through a plurality vote in Congress. The judiciary is nominally independent, though political intervention into judicial matters has been common throughout history. The Congress of Peru can also pass a motion of no confidence, censure ministers, as well as initiate impeachments and convict executives. Due to broadly interpreted impeachment wording in the 1993 Constitution of Peru, the legislative branch can impeach the president without cause, effectively making the executive branch subject to Congress. In recent times, the  legislative body has passed semi-successful impeachment and one successful impeachment; Alberto Fujimori resigned prior to removal in 2000, Pedro Pablo Kuczynski resigned in 2018 and Martín Vizcarra was removed from office in 2020.
Peru's electoral system uses compulsory voting for citizens from the age of 18 to 70, including dual-citizens and Peruvians abroad. Members of Congress are directly elected by constituents in respective districts through proportional voting. The president is elected in a general election, along with the vice president, through a majority in a two-round system. Elections are observed and organized by the National Jury of Elections, National Office of Electoral Processes, and the National Registry of Identification and Civil Status.

Peru uses a multi-party system for congressional and general elections. Major groups that have formed governments, both on a federal and legislative level, are parties that have historically adopted economic liberalism, progressivism, right-wing populism (specifically Fujimorism), nationalism, and reformism.

The most recent general election was held on 11 April 2021 and resulted in Free Peru winning the most seats in Congress, although it fell well short of a majority. A presidential runoff between Pedro Castillo and Keiko Fujimori took place on 5 June 2021 and resulted in the victory of Castillo.

Allegations of corruption in politics 

Exceptionally many presidents of Peru have been ousted from office or imprisoned on allegations of corruption over the past three decades. Alberto Fujimori is serving a 25-year sentence in prison for commanding death squads that killed civilians in a counterinsurgency campaign during his tenure (1990–2000). He was later also found guilty of corruption. Former president Alan García (1985–1990 and 2006–2011) committed suicide in April 2019 when Peruvian police arrived to arrest him over allegations he participated in Odebrecht bribery scheme. Former president Alejandro Toledo is accused of allegedly receiving bribe from Brazilian construction firm Odebrecht during his government (2001–2006). Former president Ollanta Humala (2011–2016) is also under investigation for allegedly receiving bribe from Odebrecht during his presidential election campaign. Humala's successor Pedro Pablo Kuczynski (2016–2018) remains under house arrest while prosecutors investigate him for favoring contracts with Odebrecht. Former president Martín Vizcarra (2018–2020) was ousted by Congress after media reports alleged he had received bribes while he was a regional governor years earlier.

Regions and territories 

Peru is divided into 26 units: 24 departments, the Constitutional Province of Callao and the Province of Lima (LIM) – which is independent of any region and serves as the country's capital. Under the constitution, the 24 departments plus Callao Province have an elected "regional" government composed of the regional governor and the regional council.

The governor constitutes the executive body, proposes budgets, and creates decrees, resolutions, and regional programs. The Regional Council, the region's legislative body, debates and votes on budgets, supervises regional officials, and can vote to remove the governor, deputy governor, or any member of the council from office. The regional governor and the Regional Council serve a term of four years, without immediate reelection. These governments plan regional development, execute public investment projects, promote economic activities, and manage public property.

Provinces, such as the province of Lima, are administered by a municipal council, headed by a mayor. The goal of devolving power to regional and municipal governments was among others to improve popular participation. NGOs played an important role in the decentralization process and still influence local politics.

Some areas of Peru are defined as metropolitan areas which overlap district areas. The largest of them, the Lima metropolitan area, is the seventh-largest metropolis in the Americas.

Foreign relations

Over recent decades, Peru's foreign relations has historically been dominated by close ties with the United States and Asia, particularly through the Asia-Pacific Economic Cooperation (APEC), the World Trade Organization, the Pacific Alliance, Mercosur, and the Organization of American States (OAS).
Peru is an active member of several regional trade blocs and is one of the founding members of the Andean Community of Nations. It is also a member of international organizations such as the OAS and the United Nations. Javier Pérez de Cuéllar, a celebrated Peruvian diplomat, served as United Nations Secretary General from 1981 to 1991.

Peru has planned to be fully integrated into the Organization for Economic Co-operation and Development (OECD) by 2021, attributing its economic success and efforts to strengthen institutions as meeting factors to be a part of the OECD. Peru is a member of the World Trade Organization, and has pursued multiple major free trade agreements, most recently the Peru–United States Free Trade Agreement, the China–Peru Free Trade Agreement, the European Union Free Trade Agreement, free trade agreements with Japan, and many others.

Peru maintains an integrated relationship with other South American nations, and is a member of various South American intergovernmental agreements, more recently the Organization of American States, Mercosur, the Andean Community of Nations, the Pacific Alliance, and the APEC. Peru has historically experienced stressed relations with Chile, including the Peru v Chile international court resolution and the Chilean-Peruvian maritime dispute, but the two countries have agreed to work in improving relations.

Additionally, Peru has participated in taking a leading role in addressing the crisis in Venezuela through the establishment of the Lima Group.

Military and law enforcement

Peru has the fourth largest military in Latin America. Peru's armed forcesthe Armed Forces of Perucomprise the Peruvian Navy (MGP), the Peruvian Army (EP), and the Peruvian Air Force (FAP), in total numbering 392,660 personnel (including 120,660 regulars and 272,000 reservists) as of 2020. Their primary mission is to safeguard the independence, sovereignty and territorial integrity of the country.

Their functions are separated by branch:

 The Peruvian Army is made up of the Chief of Staff, two Control Bodies, two Support Bodies, five Military Regions and six Command Rooms.
 The Peruvian Air Force was officially created on 20 May 1929, with the name of Peruvian Aviation Corps. Its main function is to serve as the country's air defense. It also participates in social support campaigns for hard-to-reach populations, organizes air bridges during disasters, and participates in international peace missions. Its four major air bases are located in the cities of Piura, Callao, Arequipa and Iquitos.
The Peruvian Navy is in charge of the country's maritime, river, and lake defense. It is made up of 26,000 sailors. Personnel are divided into three levels: superior personnel, junior personnel and seafarers.

The military is governed by both the commander in chief, Ministry of Defense, and Joint Command of the Armed Forces (CCFFAA). The CCFFAA has subordinates to the Operational Commands and Special Commands, with which it carries out the military operations that are required for the defense and the fulfillment of the tasks that the executive power provides. Conscription was abolished in 1999 and replaced by voluntary military service. The National Police of Peru is often classified as a part of the armed forces. Although in fact it has a different organization and a wholly civil mission, its training and activities over more than two decades as an anti-terrorist force have produced markedly military characteristics, giving it the appearance of a virtual fourth military service with significant land, sea and air capabilities and approximately 140,000 personnel. The Peruvian armed forces report through the Ministry of Defense, while the National Police of Peru reports through the Ministry of Interior.

Since the end of the crisis in Peru in 2000, the federal government has significantly reduced annual spending in defense. In the 2016–2017 budget, defense spending has constituted 1.1% of GDP ($2.3 billion), the second lowest spending relative to GDP in South America following Argentina. More recently, the Armed Forces of Peru have been used in civil defense. In 2020, Peru used its military personnel and even reservists to enforce the strict quarantine measures placed during the COVID-19 pandemic.

Geography 

Peru is located on the central western coast of South America facing the Pacific Ocean. It borders Ecuador and Colombia to the north, Brazil to the east, Bolivia to the southeast, Chile to the south, and the Pacific Ocean to the west. The Andes mountains run parallel to the Pacific Ocean; they define the three regions traditionally used to describe the country geographically.

The costa (coast), to the west, is a narrow, largely arid plain except for valleys created by seasonal rivers. The sierra (highlands) is the region of the Andes; it includes the Altiplano plateau as well as the highest peak of the country, the  Huascarán. The third region is the selva (jungle), a wide expanse of flat terrain covered by the Amazon rainforest that extends east. Almost 60 percent of the country's area is located within this region. The country has fifty-four hydrographic basins, fifty-two of which are small coastal basins that discharge their waters into the Pacific Ocean. The final two are the endorheic basin of Lake Titicaca, and the Amazon basin, which empties into the Atlantic Ocean. Both are delimited by the Andes mountain range. The Amazon basin is particularly noteworthy as it is the source of the Amazon River, which at 6872 km, is the longest river in the world, and covers 75% of Peruvian territory. Peru contains 4% of the planet's freshwater.

Most Peruvian rivers originate in the peaks of the Andes and drain into one of three basins. Those that drain toward the Pacific Ocean are steep and short, flowing only intermittently. Tributaries of the Amazon River have a much larger flow, and are longer and less steep once they exit the sierra. Rivers that drain into Lake Titicaca are generally short and have a large flow. Peru's longest rivers are the Ucayali, the Marañón, the Putumayo, the Yavarí, the Huallaga, the Urubamba, the Mantaro, and the Amazon.

The largest lake in Peru, Lake Titicaca between Peru and Bolivia high in the Andes, is also the largest of South America.
The largest reservoirs, all in the coastal region of Peru, are the Poechos, Tinajones, San Lorenzo, and El Fraile reservoirs.

Climate 

The combination of tropical latitude, mountain ranges, topography variations, and two ocean currents (Humboldt and El Niño) gives Peru a large diversity of climates. The coastal region has moderate temperatures, low precipitation, and high humidity, except for its warmer, wetter northern reaches. In the mountain region, rain is frequent in summer, and temperature and humidity diminish with altitude up to the frozen peaks of the Andes. The Peruvian Amazon is characterized by heavy rainfall and high temperatures, except for its southernmost part, which has cold winters and seasonal rainfall.

Wildlife

Because of its varied geography and climate, Peru has a high biodiversity with 21,462 species of plants and animals reported as of 2003, 5,855 of them endemic, and is one of the megadiverse countries.

Peru has over 1,800 species of birds (120 endemic), over 500 species of mammals, over 300 species of reptiles, and over 1,000 species of freshwater fishes. The hundreds of mammals include rare species like the puma, jaguar and spectacled bear. The Birds of Peru produce large amounts of guano, an economically important export. The Pacific holds large quantities of sea bass, flounder, anchovies, tuna, crustaceans, and shellfish, and is home to many sharks, sperm whales, and whales. The invertebrate fauna is far less inventoried; at least beetles (Coleoptera) have been surveyed in the "Beetles of Peru" project, led by Caroline S. Chaboo, University of Nebraska, USA and this revealved more 12,000 documented and many new species for Peru.

Peru also has an equally diverse flora. The coastal deserts produce little more than cacti, apart from hilly fog oases and river valleys that contain unique plant life.
The Highlands above the tree-line known as puna is home to bushes, cactus, drought-resistant plants such as ichu, and the largest species of bromeliad – the spectacular Puya raimondii.

The cloud-forest slopes of the Andes sustain moss, orchids, and bromeliads, and the Amazon rainforest is known for its variety of trees and canopy plants. Peru had a 2019 Forest Landscape Integrity Index mean score of 8.86/10, ranking it 14th globally out of 172 countries.

Economy

The economy of Peru is the 48th largest in the world (ranked by Purchasing power parity), and the income level is classified as upper middle by the World Bank. Peru is, one of the world's fastest-growing economies owing to an economic boom experienced during the 2000s. It has an above-average Human Development Index of 0.77 which has seen steady improvement over  Historically, the country's economic performance has been tied to exports, which provide hard currency to finance imports and external debt payments. Although they have provided substantial revenue, self-sustained growth and a more egalitarian distribution of income have proven elusive. According to 2015 data, 19.3% of its total population is poor, including 9% that lives in extreme poverty. Inflation in 2012 was the lowest in Latin America at only 1.8%, but increased in 2013 as oil and commodity prices rose;  it stands at 2.5%. The unemployment rate has fallen steadily  and  stands at 3.6%.

Peruvian economic policy has varied widely over  The 1968–1975 government of Juan Velasco Alvarado introduced radical reforms, which included agrarian reform, the expropriation of foreign companies, the introduction of an economic planning system, and the creation of a large state-owned sector. These measures failed to achieve their objectives of income redistribution and the end of economic dependence on developed nations.

Despite these results, most reforms were not reversed until the 1990s, when the liberalizing government of Alberto Fujimori ended price controls, protectionism, restrictions on foreign direct investment, and most state ownership of companies.

 Services account for 53% of Peruvian gross domestic product, followed by manufacturing (22.3%), extractive industries (15%), and taxes (9.7%). Recent economic growth had been fueled by macroeconomic stability, improved terms of trade, and rising investment and consumption. Trade was expected to increase further after the implementation of a free trade agreement with the United States signed on 12 April 2006. Peru's main exports were copper, gold, zinc, textiles, and fish meal; its major trade partners were the United States, China, Brazil, and Chile. Peru was ranked 70th in the Global Innovation Index in 2021.

Mining 
The country is heavily dependent on mining for the export of raw materials, which represent 60% of exports: in 2019, the country was the second world producer of copper, silver and zinc, eighth world producer of gold, third world producer of lead, the world's fourth largest producer of tin, the fifth world's largest producer of boron and the world's fourth largest producer of molybdenum. – not to mention gas and of oil. Little industrialized, Peru suffers from the international variation of commodity prices.

Agriculture 
Peru is the world's largest producer of quinoa, one of the 5 largest producers of avocado, blueberry, artichoke and asparagus, one of the 10 largest producers in the world of coffee and cocoa, and one of the 15 largest producers in the world of potato and pineapple, also having a considerable production of grape, sugarcane, rice, banana, maize and cassava; its agriculture is considerably diversified. In livestock, Peru is one of the 20 largest producers of chicken meat in the world.

Industry 
The World Bank lists the top producing countries each year, based on the total value of production. By the 2019 list, Peru has the 50th most valuable industry in the world ($28.7 billion).

In 2016 Peru was the world's largest supplier of fishmeal.

Infrastructure

Transport 

Some highways in the country that stand out are the Pan American Highway and Interoceanic Highway. In 2016, the country had  of duplicated highways, and was investing in more duplications: the plan was to have  in 2026. The country's rail network is small: in 2018, the country only had  of railways.

Peru has important international airports such as Lima, Cuzco and Arequipa. The 10 busiest airports in South America in 2017 were: São Paulo-Guarulhos (Brazil), Bogotá (Colombia), São Paulo-Congonhas (Brazil), Santiago (Chile), Lima (Peru), Brasília (Brazil), Rio de Janeiro (Brazil), Buenos Aires-Aeroparque (Argentina), Buenos Aires-Ezeiza (Argentina) and Minas Gerais (Brazil).

Peru has important ports in Callao, Ilo and Matarani. The 15 most active ports in South America in 2018 were: Port of Santos (Brazil), Port of Bahia de Cartagena (Colombia), Callao (Peru), Guayaquil (Ecuador), Buenos Aires (Argentina), San Antonio (Chile), Buenaventura (Colombia), Itajaí (Brazil), Valparaíso (Chile), Montevideo (Uruguay), Paranaguá (Brazil), Rio Grande (Brazil), São Francisco do Sul (Brazil), Manaus (Brazil) and Coronel (Chile).

Energy 
Peruvian electricity production totaled 49.3 million GWh in November 2021. Of these, 52% came from hydroelectric plants, 38.3% from thermoelectric plants (which use oil, gas and coal) and 9.7% of renewable energy plants like: wind, solar, and others.

In 2021, Peru had, in terms of installed renewable electricity, 5,490 MW in hydropower (34th largest in the world), 409 MW in wind power (49th largest in the world), 336 MW in solar power (62nd largest in the world), and 185 MW in biomass.

Demographics 

With about 31.2 million inhabitants in 2017, Peru is the fourth most populous country in South America. The demographic growth rate of Peru declined from 2.6% to 1.6% between 1950 and 2000; with the population being expected to reach approximately 42 million in 2050. According to the 1940 Peruvian census, Peru had a population at the time of seven million residents.

, 79.3% lived in urban areas and 20.7% in rural areas. Major cities include the Lima metropolitan area (home to over 9.8 million people), Arequipa, Trujillo, Chiclayo, Piura, Iquitos, Cusco, Chimbote, and Huancayo; all reported more than 250,000 inhabitants in the 2007 census. There are 15 uncontacted Amerindian tribes in Peru. Peru has a life expectancy of 75.0 years (72.4 for males and 77.7 for females) according to the latest data for the year 2016 from the World Bank.

Ethnic groups

Peru is a multiethnic nation formed by successive waves of different peoples over five centuries. Amerindians inhabited Peruvian territory for several millennia before the Spanish conquest in the 16th century; according to historian Noble David Cook, their population decreased from nearly 5–9 million in the 1520s to around 600,000 in 1620 mainly because of infectious diseases.

The 2017 census for the first time included a question on ethnic self-identification. According to the results, 60.2% of the people identified themselves as mestizo, 22.3% identified themselves as Quechua, 5.9% identified themselves as white, 3.6% identified themselves as black, 2.4% identified themselves as Aymara, 2.3% identified themselves as other ethnic groups, and 3.3% didn't declare their ethnicity.

Spaniards and Africans arrived in large numbers under colonial rule, mixing widely with each other and with Indigenous peoples. After independence, there was gradual immigration from England, France, Germany, and Italy. Peru freed its black slaves in 1854. Chinese and Japanese arrived in the 1850s as laborers following the end of slavery, and have since become a major influence in Peruvian society.

Language

According to the Peruvian Constitution of 1993, Peru's official languages are Spanish and, in areas where they predominate, Quechua and other Indigenous languages. Spanish is spoken natively by 82.6% of the population, Quechua by 13.9%, and Aymara by 1.7%, while other languages are spoken by the remaining 1.8%.

Spanish language is used by the government and is the mainstream language of the country, which is used by the media and in educational systems and commerce. Amerindians who live in the Andean highlands speak Quechua and Aymara and are ethnically distinct from the diverse Indigenous groups who live on the eastern side of the Andes and in the tropical lowlands adjacent to the Amazon basin.

Peru's distinct geographical regions are mirrored in a language divide between the coast where Spanish is more predominant over the Amerindian languages, and the more diverse traditional Andean cultures of the mountains and highlands. The Indigenous populations east of the Andes speak various languages and dialects. Some of these groups still adhere to traditional Indigenous languages, while others have been almost completely assimilated into the Spanish language. There has been an increasing and organized effort to teach Quechua in public schools in the areas where Quechua is spoken. In the Peruvian Amazon, numerous Indigenous languages are spoken, including Asháninka, Bora, and Aguaruna.

Religion

Roman Catholicism has been the predominant faith in Peru for centuries, albeit religious practices have a high degree of syncretism with Indigenous traditions. Two of its universities, Pontifical Catholic University of Peru and Universidad Cattolica San Pablo, are among the 5 top universities of the country. As of the 2017 census, 76% of the population over 12 years old described themselves as Catholic, 14.1% as Evangelical, 4.8% as Protestant, Jewish, Latter-day Saints, and Jehovah's Witnesses, and 5.1% as nonreligious.

Amerindian religious traditions continue to play a major role in the beliefs of Peruvians. Catholic festivities like Corpus Christi, Holy Week and Christmas sometimes blend with Amerindian traditions. Amerindian festivities from pre-Columbian remain widespread; Inti Raymi, an ancient Inca festival, is still celebrated, especially in rural communities.

The majority of towns, cities, and villages have their own official church or cathedral and patron saint.

Education

Peru's literacy rate is estimated at 92.9% as of 2007; this rate is lower in rural areas (80.3%) than in urban areas (96.3%). Primary and secondary education are compulsory and free in public schools.

Peru is home to one of the oldest institutions of higher learning in the New World. The National University of San Marcos, founded on 12 May 1551, during the Viceroyalty of Peru, is the first officially established and the oldest continuously functioning university in the Americas.

Toponyms 
Many of the Peruvian toponyms have Indigenous sources. In the Andes communities of Ancash, Cusco and Puno, Quechua or Aymara names are overwhelmingly predominant. Their Spanish-based orthography, however, is in conflict with the normalized alphabets of these languages. According to Article 20 of Decreto Supremo No 004-2016-MC (Supreme Decree) which approves the Regulations to Law 29735, published in the official newspaper El Peruano on 22 July 2016, adequate spellings of the toponyms in the normalized alphabets of the Indigenous languages must progressively be proposed with the aim of standardizing the naming used by the National Geographic Institute (Instituto Geográfico Nacional, IGN). The National Geographic Institute realizes the necessary changes in the official maps of Peru.

Culture 

Peruvian culture is primarily rooted in Andean and Iberian traditions, though it has also been influenced by various Asian and African ethnic groups. Peruvian artistic traditions date back to the elaborate pottery, textiles, jewelry, and sculpture of Pre-Inca cultures. The Incas maintained these crafts and made architectural achievements including the construction of Machu Picchu. Baroque dominated colonial art, though modified by Native traditions.

During this period, most art focused on religious subjects; the numerous churches of the era and the paintings of the Cusco School are representative. Arts stagnated after independence until the emergence of Indigenismo in the early 20th century. Since the 1950s, Peruvian art has been eclectic and shaped by both foreign and local art currents.

Visual Arts

Peruvian art has its origin in the Andean civilizations. These civilizations arose in the territory of modern Peru before the arrival of the Spanish. Peruvian art incorporated European elements after the Spanish conquest and continued to evolve throughout the centuries up to the modern day.

Pre-Columbian art 

Peru's earliest artwork came from the Cupisnique culture, which was concentrated on the Pacific coast, and the Chavín culture, which was largely north of Lima between the Andean mountain ranges of the Cordillera Negra and the Cordillera Blanca. Decorative work from this era, approximately the 9th century BCE, was symbolic and religious in nature. The artists worked with gold, silver, and ceramics to create a variety of sculptures and relief carvings. These civilizations were also known for their architecture and wood sculptures.

Between the 9th century BCE and the 2nd century CE, the Paracas Cavernas and Paracas Necropolis cultures developed on the south coast of Peru. Paracas Cavernas produced complex polychrome and monochrome ceramics with religious representations. Burials from the Paracas Necropolis also yielded complex textiles, many produced with sophisticated geometric patterns.

The 3rd century BCE saw the flowering of the urban culture, Moche, in the Lambayeque region. The Moche culture produced impressive architectural works, such as the Huacas del Sol y de la Luna and the Huaca Rajada of Sipán. They were experts at cultivation in terraces and hydraulic engineering and produced original ceramics, textiles, pictorial and sculptural works.

Another urban culture, the Wari civilization, flourished between the 8th and 12th centuries in Ayacucho. Their centralized town planning was extended to other areas, such as Pachacamac, Cajamarquilla and Wari Willka.

Between the 9th and 13th centuries CE, the military urban Tiwanaku empire rose by the borders of Lake Titicaca. Centered around a city of the same name in modern-day Bolivia, the Tiwanaku introduced stone architecture and sculpture of a monumental type. These works of architecture and art were made possible by the Tiwanaku's developing bronze, which enabled them to make the necessary tools.

Urban architecture reached a new height between the 14th and 15th centuries in the Chimú Culture. The Chimú built the city of Chan Chan in the valley of the Moche River, in La Libertad. The Chimú were skilled goldsmiths and created remarkable works of hydraulic engineering.

The Inca Civilization, which united Peru under its hegemony in the centuries immediately preceding the Spanish conquest, incorporated into their own works a great part of the cultural legacy of the civilizations which preceded it. Important relics of their artwork and architecture can be seen in cities like Cusco, architectural remains like Sacsahuamán and Machu Picchu and stone pavements that united Cusco with the rest of the Inca Empire.

Colonial art 

Peruvian sculpture and painting began to define themselves from the ateliers founded by monks, who were strongly influenced by the Sevillian Baroque School. In this context, the stalls of the Cathedral choir, the fountain of the Main Square of Lima both by Pedro de Noguera, and a great part of the colonial production were registered. The first center of art established by the Spanish was the Cuzco School that taught Quechua artists European painting styles. Diego Quispe Tito (1611–1681) was one of the first members of the Cuzco school and Marcos Zapata (1710–1773) was one of the last.

Painting of this time reflected a synthesis of European and Indigenous influences, as is evident in the portrait of prisoner Atahualpa, by D. de Mora or in the canvases of the Italians Mateo Pérez de Alesio and Angelino Medoro, the Spaniards Francisco Bejarano and J. de Illescas and the Creole J. Rodriguez.

During the 17th and 18th centuries, the Baroque Style also dominated the field of plastic arts.

Literature 

The term Peruvian literature not only refers to literature produced in the independent Republic of Peru, but also to literature produced in the Viceroyalty of Peru during the country's colonial period, and to oral artistic forms created by diverse ethnic groups that existed in the area during the pre-Columbian period, such as the Quechua, the Aymara and the Chanka people.

Peruvian literature is rooted in the oral traditions of pre-Columbian civilizations. Spaniards introduced writing in the 16th century; colonial literary expression included chronicles and religious literature. After independence, Costumbrism and Romanticism became the most common literary genres, as exemplified in the works of Ricardo Palma. The early 20th century's Indigenismo movement was led by such writers as Ciro Alegría and José María Arguedas. César Vallejo wrote modernist and often politically engaged verse. Modern Peruvian literature is recognized thanks to authors such as Nobel laureate Mario Vargas Llosa, a leading member of the Latin American Boom.

Cuisine 

Because of the Spanish expedition and discovery of America, explorers started the Columbian exchange which included unknown food in the Old World, including potatoes, tomatoes, and maize. Modern Indigenous Peruvian food often includes corn, potatoes, and chilies. There are now more than 3,000 kinds of potatoes grown on Peruvian terrain, according to Peru's Instituto Peruano de la Papa.
Modern Peruvian cuisine blends Amerindian and Spanish food with strong influences from Chinese, African, Arab, Italian, and Japanese cooking. Common dishes include anticuchos, ceviche, and pachamanca. Peru's varied climate allows the growth of diverse plants and animals good for cooking.

Peruvian cuisine reflects local practices and ingredientsincluding influences from the Indigenous population including the Inca and cuisines brought in with colonizers and immigrants. Without the familiar ingredients from their home countries, immigrants modified their traditional cuisines by using ingredients available in Peru. The four traditional staples of Peruvian cuisine are corn, potatoes and other tubers, Amaranthaceaes (quinoa, kañiwa and kiwicha) and legumes (beans and lupins). Staples brought by the Spanish include rice, wheat, and meats (beef, pork, and chicken). Many traditional foodssuch as quinoa, kiwicha, chili peppers, and several roots and tubers have increased in popularity in recent decades, reflecting a revival of interest in Native Peruvian foods and culinary techniques. It is also common to see traditional cuisines being served with a modern flair in towns like Cusco, where tourists come to visit. Chef Gaston Acurio has become well known for raising awareness of local ingredients.

Music 

Peruvian music has Andean, Spanish, and African roots. In pre-Columbian times, musical expressions varied widely in each region; the quena and the tinya were two common instruments. Spaniards introduced new instruments, such as the guitar and the harp, which led to the development of crossbred instruments like the charango. African contributions to Peruvian music include its rhythms and the cajón, a percussion instrument. Peruvian folk dances include marinera, tondero, zamacueca, diablada and huayno.

Peruvian music is dominated by the national instrument, the charango. The charango is a member of the lute family of instruments and was invented during colonial times by musicians imitating the Spanish vihuela. In the Canas and Titicaca regions, the charango is used in courtship rituals, symbolically invoking mermaids with the instrument to lure the woman to the male performers. Until the 1960s, the charango was denigrated as an instrument of the rural poor. After the revolution in 1959, which built the Indigenismo movement (1910–1940), the charango was popularized among other performers. Variants include the walaycho, chillador, chinlili, and the larger and lower-tuned charangon.

While the Spanish guitar is widely played, so too is the Spanish-in-origin bandurria. Unlike the guitar, it has been transformed by Peruvian players over the years, changing from a 12-string, 6-course instrument to one having 12 to 16 strings in a mere four courses. Violins and harps, also of European origin, are also played.

Cinema 
While the Peruvian film industry has not been nearly as prolific as that of some other Latin American countries, some Peruvian movies produced enjoyed regional success. Historically, the cinema of Peru began in Iquitos in 1932 by Antonio Wong Rengifo (with a momentous, initial film billboard from 1900) because of the rubber boom and the intense arrival of foreigners with technology to the city, and thus continued an extensive, unique filmography, with a different style than the films made in the capital, Lima.

Peru also produced the first animated 3-D film in Latin America, Piratas en el Callao. This film is set in the historical port city of Callao, which during colonial times had to defend itself against attacks by Dutch and British privateers seeking to undercut Spain's trade with its colonies. The film was produced by the Peruvian company Alpamayo Entertainment, which made a second 3-D film one year later: Dragones: Destino de Fuego.

In February 2006, the film Madeinusa, produced as a joint venture between Peru and Spain and directed by Claudia Llosa, was set in an imaginary Andean village and describes the stagnating life of Madeinusa performed by Magaly Solier and the traumas of post-civil war Peru.

Llosa, who shared elements of Gabriel García Márquez's magic realism, won an award at the Rotterdam Film Festival. Llosa's second feature, The Milk of Sorrow ("La Teta Asustada"), was nominated for the 82nd Academy Awards for Best Foreign Language Picture, the first Peruvian film in the academy's history to be nominated. The Milk of Sorrow ("La Teta Asustada"), won the Golden Bear award at the 2009 Berlinale.

See also

Outline of Peru

Notes and references

Notes

Citations

Bibliography 

 Bailey, Gauvin Alexander. Art of colonial Latin America. London: Phaidon, 2005, .
 Constitución Política del Perú. 29 December 1993.
 Custer, Tony. The Art of Peruvian Cuisine. Lima: Ediciones Ganesha, 2003, .
 Garland, Gonzalo. "Perú Siglo XXI", series of 11 working papers describing sectorial long-term forecasts, Grade, Lima, Peru, 1986–1987.
 Garland, Gonzalo. Peru in the 21st Century: Challenges and Possibilities in Futures: the Journal of Forecasting, Planning, and Policy, Volume 22, No. 4, Butterworth-Heinemann, London, England, May 1990.
 Gootenberg, Paul. (1991) Between silver and guano: commercial policy and the state in postindependence Peru. Princeton: Princeton University Press .
 Gootenberg, Paul. (1993) Imagining development: economic ideas in Peru's "fictitious prosperity" of Guano, 1840–1880. Berkeley: University of California Press, .
 Higgins, James (editor). The Emancipation of Peru: British Eyewitness Accounts, 2014. Online at jhemanperu 
 Instituto de Estudios Histórico–Marítimos del Perú. El Perú y sus recursos: Atlas geográfico y económico. Lima: Auge, 1996.
 Instituto Nacional de Estadística e Informática.  . Lima: INEI, 2005.
 Instituto Nacional de Estadística e Informática. Perfil sociodemográfico del Perú. Lima: INEI, 2008.
 Instituto Nacional de Estadística e Informática. Perú: Estimaciones y Proyecciones de Población, 1950–2050. Lima: INEI, 2001.
 . 28 September 1999.
 Ley N° 27867, Ley Ley Orgánica de Gobiernos Regionales. 16 November 2002.
 Martin, Gerald. "Literature, music and the visual arts, c. 1820–1870". In: Leslie Bethell (ed.), A cultural history of Latin America. Cambridge: University of Cambridge, 1998, pp. 3–45.
 Martin, Gerald. "Narrative since c. 1920". In: Leslie Bethell (ed.), A cultural history of Latin America. Cambridge: University of Cambridge, 1998, pp. 133–225.
 Porras Barrenechea, Raúl. El nombre del Perú. Lima: Talleres Gráficos P.L. Villanueva, 1968.
 
 Thorp, Rosemary, and Geoffrey Bertram. Peru 1890–1977: growth and policy in an open economy. New York: Columbia University Press, 1978,

Further reading 

Economy
  Banco Central de Reserva. Cuadros Anuales Históricos .
  Instituto Nacional de Estadística e Informática. Perú: Perfil de la pobreza por departamentos, 2004–2008. Lima: INEI, 2009.
 Concha, Jaime. "Poetry, c. 1920–1950". In: Leslie Bethell (ed.), A cultural history of Latin America. Cambridge: University of Cambridge, 1998, pp. 227–260.

External links 

 Country Profile from BBC News
 Peru. The World Factbook. Central Intelligence Agency.

 Google search
 World Bank Summary Trade Statistics Peru
 PeruLinks  web directory
 
 
  Web portal of the Peruvian Government
 

 
Andean Community
Countries in South America
Former Spanish colonies
Member states of the United Nations
Republics
Spanish-speaking countries and territories
States and territories established in 1821
Cradle of civilization